The 2010 Mexican League season was the 86th season in the history of the Mexican League. It was contested by 16 teams, evenly divided in North and South zones. The season started on 16 March with the match between 2009 season champions Saraperos de Saltillo and Acereros de Monclova and ended on 26 August with the last game of the Serie del Rey, where the Saraperos defeated Pericos de Puebla to win their second championship in a row.

The Mexican League joined the celebration of the Bicentennial of the Mexican War of Independence and the Centennial of the Mexican Revolution. Both zones were renamed: the North zone to Francisco I. Madero and the South zone to Miguel Hidalgo; the championship series, Serie del Rey, was also renamed to Serie del Bicentenario (Bicentennial Series).

Standings

Postseason

League leaders

Awards

References

Mexican League season
Mexican League season
Mexican League seasons